Barrack Young Controllers Football Club is a football club based in Monrovia, Liberia. Founded in 1997, the club competes in the Liberian Premier League.

Squad

Achievements
Liberian Premier League
Champions (4): 2013, 2014, 2016, 2018

Liberian Cup
Winners (4): 2009, 2012 (reserve side), 2013, 2015 (reserve side)

Liberian Super Cup
Winners (4): 2010, 2013, 2015, 2015–16 (reserve side)

External links

Football clubs in Liberia
Sport in Monrovia
Association football clubs established in 1997
1997 establishments in Liberia